The Institute of the Lithuanian Language in Vilnius is a state-supported research organization that focuses on research into the Lithuanian language. The Institute of the Lithuanian Language is a research establishment with longstanding traditions. Founded in Vilnius back in 1941 on the basis of the Institute for Lithuanian Studies of Antanas Smetona (which itself was founded in Kaunas in 1939 and relocated to Vilnius in 1940). Today it is a state-level research body of special national importance.

History 

The origins of the institute can be traced to the editorial commission Academic Dictionary of Lithuanian, founded by Professor Juozas Balčikonis in 1930. As an outgrowth of this commission, the Antanas Smetona Institute for Lithuanian Studies was founded in 1939. This institute's goal was to research the Lithuanian language.

After the Soviet occupation of Lithuania in 1941, the Antanas Smetona Institute for Lithuanian Studies and the Lithuanian Society of Science were merged into the Institute of the Lithuanian Language, within the greater framework of the Academy of Sciences. The Institute experienced difficulties during this period; a number of prominent linguists had emigrated, there was ideological pressure to employ Marxist language theory, and contacts with the international scholarly community were curtailed. In 1952 it was merged with the Institute of Lithuanian Literature. In April 1990 the Institute regained its status as an independent institution.

Since 2002 the Institute of the Lithuanian Language has moved to a building on P. Vileišis street. Currently, the Institute of the Lithuanian Language consists of six research centres and two non-research departments.

Structure and activities 

The Institute of the Lithuanian Language conducts scientific research on the standard Lithuanian language, Baltic languages and proper names, written heritage, geolinguistics, terminology and sociolinguistics; develops and fosters Lithuanian as a state language: addresses the issues of language standardization, performs linguistic expertise; participates in the formation of the strategy and tactics of the research and usage of the state Lithuanian language in Lithuania; organizes scientific expeditions for language data collection, accumulates Lithuanian language resources, compiles databases and manages their protection, development and use; in cooperation with the higher education institutions trains scientists of the highest qualification in the field of philology, organizes and hosts scientific conferences, promotes Lithuanian language and the results of its scientific research among the society.

Structure:

 Research Centre of the Baltic Languages and Onomastics
 Research Centre of Standard Language
 Research Centre of Geolinguistics
 Research Centre of Written Heritage
 Research Centre of Sociolinguistics
 Terminology Centre
 Lithuanian language museum Lituanistikos Židinys (Lithuanian Hearth)
 Bookstore
 Library

Directors 
 Pranas Skardžius – 1941
 Antanas Salys – 1941–1944
 Juozas Balčikonis – 1945–1952
 Kostas Korsakas – 1952–1984
 Jonas Lankutis – 1984–1990
 Aleksandras Vanagas – 1990–1995
 Albertas Rosinas – 1995
 Zigmas Zinkevičius – 1995–1996
 Algirdas Sabaliauskas – 1997–2000
 Artūras Judžentis – 2000–2001
 Giedrius Subačius – 2001–2003
 Elena Jolanta Zabarskaitė – 2003–2018
 Albina Auksoriūtė – since 2018

Major publications 
Academic Dictionary of Lithuanian (20 volumes), The Dictionary of the Modern Lithuanian Language, The Dictionary of Synonyms, The Dictionary of Antonyms, The Dictionary of Phraseology, The Dictionary of Comparisons, The Systemic Dictionary of the Lithuanian Language, the Dictionary of Lithuanian Polonisms, various monographs, atlases, and so on.

References

External links 
 Official website
 Dictionary of the Lithuanian Language 
 Creating the Electronic Version of the Dictionary of the Lithuanian Language
 Eighth United Nations Conference on the Standardization of Geographical Names

Research institutes in Lithuania
Lithuanian language
Linguistic research institutes
Organizations based in Vilnius